Dyspessa blonda is a moth in the family Cossidae. It was described by Yakovlev in 2008. It is found in Turkey.

The length of the forewings is 10–13 mm for males and 12–13 mm for females. The forewings are uniform light-yellow in males. The hindwings have a greyish suffusion. Females are much darker, the forewings are dull-yellow and the hindwings are light-brown.

References

Natural History Museum Lepidoptera generic names catalog

Moths described in 2008
Dyspessa
Moths of Asia